Johann Kremenezky (also Kremenetski) (Hebrew: יונה קרמנצקי)  February 15, 1850 –  October 25, 1934,  was a Zionist industrialist, electrical engineer, founder of the Jewish National Fund, and personal secretary and adviser to Theodor Herzl.

Biography
Jonas Yosipovich Levinson (later Yona Kremenezky) was born in Odessa. He was the owner of Kremenezky, Mayer & Co, a noted electric lighting company in Vienna. In the summer of 1896, Kremenezky met with Theodor Herzl, leader of the Zionist movement, to discuss the implementation of modern technology in the future Jewish state.

Zionist activism 
Kremenezky was the first chairman of the Jewish National Fund (JNF) from 1902 to 1907. JNF's blue charity boxes were distributed by the JNF almost from its inception at the initiative of Kremenezky. Once found in many Jewish homes, the boxes became one of the most familiar symbols of Zionism. Additionally he sold stamps to raise funds.

Awards and recognition

In 1930, he was awarded the Wilhelm Exner Medal
On 20 June 1956 a street was named after him in Vienna, called Kremenetzkygasse.

Streets in Tel Aviv and Jerusalem have been named for him.

References

Further reading 
 Salomon Wininger: Große Jüdische National-Biographie ("Lexicon of Jewish National Biographies"). Vol. 4. Chernivtsi 1930.
 Mascha Hoff: Johann Kremenezky und die Gründung des KKL. ("J. K. and the founding of the KKL"). Lang, Frankfurt/M. u. a. 1986, .

1850 births
1934 deaths
Austrian Zionists
Odesa Jews
Businesspeople from Vienna